The black lark (Melanocorypha yeltoniensis) is a species of lark in the family Alaudidae found in south-eastern Russia and Kazakhstan.

Taxonomy and systematics
The black lark was originally placed in the genus Alauda. The current genus name is from Ancient Greek. Melanocorypha is from melas, "black", and koruphos a term used by ancient writers for a now unknown bird, but here confused with korudos, "lark". The specific yeltoniensis is from Lake Yelton in the Volgograd region of Russia.

Description
This is a large, robust lark,  in length. The adult male is unmistakable, being all black with some pale feather fringes on its back, and with a yellowish or pink bill. The female is undistinguished in comparison, mainly dark-blotched grey above and paler below. Her legs and underwing are black.

The song is like a frantic version of that of Eurasian skylark.

Distribution and habitat
This is a bird of open steppe, often near water. It is partially migratory, with birds from the northwest of its breeding range moving south-east to winter further into Russia and neighbouring countries, as far as the northern Black Sea coasts in southern Ukraine.

The black lark is a very rare vagrant away from its breeding range, with records during both spring and autumn passage periods, and also in winter; the following is a complete list of European records away from the breeding range and normal wintering range as of 2005.

 1803 Italy. A male at Alessandria, Piedmont, on an unknown date in autumn
 19th Century Austria. Three males, one shot, at Breitensee, Vienna, on an unknown date between 1857 & 1874
 1874 North Sea. A female on Heligoland (then British) on 27 April
 1892 North Sea. A male on Heligoland (then German) on 27 July
 1897 Moldova. One in March
 1900 Romania. One in Dobruja in March
 1914 Turkey. One at Küçükçekmece, Istanbul, on 14 October
 1929 Malta. One in winter
 1930 Greece. One at Athens in spring
 1958 Greece A male at Athens on 20 April
 1961 Italy. One at Manfredonia, Apulia, on 3 May
 1963 Greece. A flock of eight at Lake Koronia on 20 February
 1964 Greece. Two at the Axios Delta on 8 February
 1981 Czech Republic. A male at Zakupy on 28 November
 1984 Great Britain. (England) A male at Spurn, Yorkshire on 27 April
 1988 Poland. One at Kosienice on 17 January
 1989 Finland. A male at Joensuu on 24 March
 1989 Finland. A male at Korpo on 8 April
 1993 Sweden. A male at Karlstad on 6 & 7 May
 1995 Bulgaria. A female at Cape Kaliakra on 25 May
 2003 Great Britain. (Wales) A male at RSPB South Stack, Anglesey from 1 to 8 June

An individual was also recorded on an unknown date (prior to 2003) in Lebanon.

Behaviour and ecology
Its nest is on the ground, with 4–5 eggs being laid. Food is seeds and insects, the latter especially in the breeding season. It is gregarious in winter.

References

black lark
Birds of Central Asia
black lark
Taxa named by Johann Reinhold Forster